Fo is a department or commune of Houet Province in south-western Burkina Faso.

Towns and villages

References

Departments of Burkina Faso
Houet Province